Sickingmühlenbach is a river of North Rhine-Westphalia, Germany. It flows into the Lippe near Marl. Upstream from the confluence with its main tributary, the Loemühlenbach, it is also called Silvertbach.

See also
List of rivers of North Rhine-Westphalia

References

Rivers of North Rhine-Westphalia
Rivers of Germany